Roberto Ransom Carty (born 1960) is a Mexican writer. Regarded as one of Mexico's most original authors, his published work includes novels, collections of short stories, poetry, an essay on Graham Greene and work on Mexico, as well as several award-winning children's books. He is a member of the Sistema Nacional de Creadores de Arte.

Early life and education 
Roberto Ransom was born in Mexico City to a second-generation Irish American family that emigrated to Mexico. For his undergraduate education, Ransom applied to the National Autonomous University of Mexico where he studied dramatic literature and theater at the School of Philosophy and Letters. His time there introduced him to the artistic world of Mexico during the La Decada Perdida of the 1980s. 

After nearly a decade of working as a journalist and writer, Ransom received a Fulbright-Garcia Robles Scholarship and studied for a M.A. and a PhD degree in theology, ethics, and culture at the University of Virginia in the late 1990s. Afterwards, he returned to Mexico to write and teach at the Autonomous University of Chihuahua.

Writing style 
At the School of Philosophy and Letters, and during his early career, Roberto Ransom formed close friendships with other young writers such as Ana García Bergua, Tedi López Mills, Ignacio Padilla, and Jennifer Clement.This generation of writers discovered beyond magic realism through work that was only implicitly related to Mexico or Latin America. Instead, it placed emphasis on experimentation and structure by using polyphonic and nonlinear narratives, as well as unreliable narrators, and usage of Mexican Spanish. Ransom's work is unique in that it can also be read as simultaneously relating to the foreign experience in Mexico, and to foreign realities experienced through a subtle but uniquely Mexican sensibility. 

Ransom's work is also influenced by English and American Gothic writing traditions. His writing has been described as "clear, pellucid writing for dark and tortuous stories" by American translator Edith Grossman, who went on to describe this tension as "a devastating contrast between substance and style". His writing has also been regarded as charming, subtle and refined, with emotionally deep characters and insights. Ransom's writing has at times been criticized for its anticlimactic endings, as well as intricate and demanding narratives that while atmospheric, depend largely on internal character developments that drive otherwise sparse plots.

Both his novel Tale of Two Lions (Norton 2007), and the collection of short stories Missing Persons, Animals, and Artists (Swan Isle Press/University of Chicago 2018), have been translated and published in English. Missing Persons, Animals, and Artists has enjoyed critical acclaim for its translation by Daniel Shapiro,  who was awarded grants by PEN America, and the National Endowment for the Arts for its completion.

Selected published works 

 Ransom Roberto. En esa otra tierra, Alianza Editorial (Mexico City), 1991. 
 Ransom Roberto. Historia de dos leones, Ediciones El Aduanero (Naucalpan, Mexico), 1994. 
 Ransom Roberto. Saludos a la Familia, Universidad Autónoma de México, (Toluca, Mexico) 1995. 
 Ransom Roberto. Chanterelle, Instituto Mexiquense de Cultura, (Toluca, Mexico) 1997. 
 Ransom Roberto. Desaparecidos, animales y artistas, Consejo Nacional para la Cultura y las Artes (Mexico City, Mexico), 1999. 
 Ransom Roberto. La línea del agua, Joaquín Mortiz (México City), 1999. 
 Ransom Roberto. Te guardaré la espalda, Joaquín Mortiz (México City), 2002. 
 Ransom Roberto. Museo Marino, Instituto Chihuahuense de la Cultura (Chihuahua), 2004. 
 Ransom Roberto. Los días sin Bárbara, Instituto Chihuahuense de la Cultura (Chihuahua), 2006. 
 Ransom Roberto. João y el oso Antártica, Alfaguara Infantil (Mexico City), 2006. 
 Reid Jasper (translator) A Tale of Two Lions: A Novel, Norton (New York, NY), 2007. 
 Ransom Roberto. Vidas Colapsadas, Consejo Nacional para la Cultura y las Artes (Mexico City), 2012. 
 Ransom Roberto. Carlos y los Objetos Perdidos, Alfaguara Infantil  (Mexico City), 2012. 
 Ransom Roberto. La casa desertada: Graham Greene en México, Aldus Matadero (Mexico City),2017. 
 Shapiro, Daniel (translator) Missing Persons Animals and Artists, Swan Isle Press (Chicago), 2018.

Personal life 
Roberto Ransom is married and has three children. He currently lives in Chihuahua, Mexico, where he is a tenured professor at the Autonomous University of Chihuahua.

See also 
List of Mexican writers
Irish immigration to Mexico

References

External links 
World Literature Today reviews Missing Persons, Animals, and Artists by Roberto Ransom
BOMB Magazine Roberto Ransom's A Tale of Two Lions
New York Times review of Roberto Ransom's A Tale of Two Lions by Alexander McCall Smith  

1960 births
Living people
Mexican male writers
Mexican people of Irish descent
Mexican people of American descent
University of Virginia alumni